Talal El Karkouri (born 8 July 1976) is a Moroccan former professional footballer. He played top-flight football in Morocco, France, Greece, England and Qatar before retiring in 2012. He made his international debut for Morocco in 2000, and earned 53 caps, playing at three African Cups of Nations.

Club career

Early career
Born in Casablanca, El Karkouri started his career with Raja Casablanca, and was discovered by French club Paris Saint-Germain in 2000. He played in the UEFA Cup and UEFA Champions League, but after failing to capture a regular place he was sent on loan to Aris in Greece.

On 31 January 2003 he was loaned to Sunderland of the Premier League until the end of the season. His spell was affected by injury, and he was released on 26 May after the club were relegated. The Black Cats lost in all eight of his appearances.

Charlton
In the summer of 2004, he was bought by Charlton Athletic of the Premier League for £1 million. He scored 5 goals in his debut season at Charlton, starting with the only goal in a win over Blackburn Rovers on 27 September 2004, by heading Danny Murphy's corner. He also scored the club's goal of the season against Arsenal.

On 6 April 2006, having made only 12 appearances all season, he was loaned to Al-Gharafa in Qatar.

On 30 December 2006, El Karkouri was given a yellow card by referee Rob Styles for an act of simulation in a home match against Aston Villa involving Villa defender Olof Mellberg. He was accused of a similar act against Reading on 9 April 2007 later in the same season, this time involving Reading striker Leroy Lita, who headbutted him.

Reading boss Steve Coppell accused El Karkouri of faking a 'death roll' and claimed that he would have needed treatment in intensive care had Lita headbutted him. Lita urged the FA to do something about 'diving cheats' after being hit with the ban. He said "I didn't touch him, he went down like an idiot and it was cheating". The FA disagreed and banned the Reading striker for three games for violent conduct. Coppell did not apologise for his comments.

Qatar
On 10 June 2007, following his release and Charlton's relegation, El Karkouri signed a two-year contract with Qatar Sports Club.

On 11 September 2011, after four seasons with Qatar SC, El Karkouri signed a one-year deal with another Qatari club, Umm-Salal.

On 25 May 2012, El Karkouri announced his retirement from professional football.

International career
El Karkouri was capped 53 times and scored 1 goal for Morocco. He was part of the team that finished second in the 2004 African Nations Cup.

On 29 January 2008, he announced his retirement from international football, after his team's failure to qualify for the latter stages of the 2008 African Nations Cup, but he returned on 28 March 2009 playing the 2010 World Cup qualifications match against Gabon in Casablanca.

Honours
Paris Saint-Germain
UEFA Intertoto Cup: 2001
Coupe de France: 2003–04

Morocco
Africa Cup of Nations runner-up:2004

References

External links

Bio at Charlton

Living people
1976 births
Footballers from Casablanca
Association football defenders
Moroccan footballers
Morocco international footballers
2004 African Cup of Nations players
2006 Africa Cup of Nations players
2008 Africa Cup of Nations players
Expatriate footballers in England
Expatriate footballers in Greece
Expatriate footballers in France
Expatriate footballers in Switzerland
Moroccan expatriate footballers
Moroccan expatriate sportspeople in England
Moroccan expatriate sportspeople in France
Moroccan expatriate sportspeople in Greece
Moroccan expatriate sportspeople in Qatar
Moroccan expatriate sportspeople in Switzerland
Raja CA players
Aris Thessaloniki F.C. players
Paris Saint-Germain F.C. players
Sunderland A.F.C. players
Charlton Athletic F.C. players
Premier League players
Ligue 1 players
Super League Greece players
Expatriate footballers in Qatar
Qatar SC players
Al-Gharafa SC players
Umm Salal SC players
Qatar Stars League players
Botola players